The Clostridiaceae are a family of the bacterial class Clostridia, and contain the genus Clostridium.

The family Clostridiaceae (scientific name) defined by the taxonomic outline of  Bergey's Manual of Systematic Bacteriology  contains as its core the genus Clostridium (sensu stricto), as well as Acetivibrio, Acidaminobacter, Alkaliphilus, Anaerobacter, Caloramator, Caloranaerobacter, Coprobacillus, Dorea, Natronincola, Oxobacter, Sarcina, Sporobacter, Thermobrachium, Thermohalobacter, and Tindallia. The previous inclusion of these additional genera (as seen on the right) in a family Clostridiaceae is based for the most part because the type species of these genera are in many cases phylogenetically related to misclassified species of the genus Clostridium. However, with the exception of Anaerobacter, Caloramator, Oxobacter, Sarcina, and Thermobrachium, these genera fall outside the radiation of what can be considered the true family Clostridiaceae and are now regarded as belonging to other families within the low G + C, Gram-positive phylum.

This misclassification is the result of well-known problems of the current taxonomic structure of the 
traditional genus Clostridium. The phylogenetic analysis of Collins (1994) was the first large-scale comparison of 16S rRNA gene sequences of species of the genus Clostridium and related taxa. The fact that the species of the genus Clostridium did not form a monophyletic group has been shown in a number of studies in which small groups of Clostridium species had been compared as far back as 1981. The comparative study of Collins (1994) and subsequent studies can be used to conclude that more than half of the species currently assigned to this genus are in fact not closely related to the type species, C. butyricum, and from a phylogenetic standpoint should not be included in a newly defined genus Clostridium.

This extensive genetic diversity of the genus Clostridium had been shown using 23S rRNA:DNA hybridization studies back in 1975 by Johnson and Francis, but the 16S rRNA gene sequence approach  revealed the actual phylogenetic relationships between the species of this genus and other genera.

The genus Clostridium currently comprises 152 validly described species in nomenclature. However, on the basis of 16S rRNA gene sequence analyses, only 73 of these fall within the radiation of the type species of the genus Clostridium.

Subdivisions
The polyphyletic family Clostridiaceae comprises the following:

See also
 List of bacteria genera
 List of bacterial orders

References